Salpa is a genus of tunicates belonging to the family Salpidae.

The genus has cosmopolitan distribution.

Species

Species:

Salpa amphoraeformis 
Salpa antarctica 
Salpa antheliphora

References

Tunicates